The AJW Tag Team Championship was the secondary tag team title in the Japanese professional wrestling promotion All Japan Women's Pro-Wrestling. The title was introduced in 1986 and was retired in April 2005 when the promotion closed.

Title history

Combined reigns

By team

By wrestler

See also 

 List of professional wrestling promotions in Japan
 List of women's wrestling promotions
 Professional wrestling in Japan

References

Footnotes 

All Japan Women's Pro-Wrestling Championships
Women's professional wrestling tag team championships